Refined oil may refer to:

 Refined edible oil, Edible oil refining result
 Petroleum products derived from crude oil (petroleum) as it is processed in oil refineries

See also
 Refined resource